The following is a list of notable deaths in December 2002.

Entries for each day are listed alphabetically by surname. A typical entry lists information in the following sequence:
 Name, age, country of citizenship at birth, subsequent country of citizenship (if applicable), reason for notability, cause of death (if known), and reference.

December 2002

1
Abu Abraham, 78, Indian cartoonist, journalist, and author.
Edward L. Beach Jr., 84, American highly decorated United States Navy submarine officer and best-selling author (Run Silent, Run Deep).
Omar Blebel, 80, Argentine Olympic wrestler (1948 men's Greco-Roman featherweight, 1952 men's freestyle bantamweight).
Alfred Brauner, 92, Austrian-French scholar, author and sociologist.
C. Chapin Cutler, 87, American communications engineer, known for inventions in radio, radar, signal coding, imaging and satellite communications.
Harry Dick, 82, Canadian professional ice hockey player (Chicago Blackhawks).
Eugene Turenne Gregorie, 94, American yacht designer and automobile designer.
Dave McNally, 60, American baseball player (Baltimore Orioles, Montreal Expos), lung cancer.
José Chávez Morado, 93, Mexican artist.
Michael Oliver, 65, British classical music broadcaster and writer.
Esther E. Wood, 97, American historian,  author, and journalist.

2
Elizabeth B. Andrews, 91, American politician (U.S. Representative for Alabama's 3rd congressional district).
Sanford Soverhill Atwood, 89, American scientist, plant cytologist and president of Emory University.
Barney Berlinger, 94, American Olympic decathlon athlete (men's decathlon in the 1928 Summer Olympics).
Achille Castiglioni, 84, Italian industrial designer.
Aileen Fisher, 96, American writer of more than 100 children's books (The Coffee-Pot Face, Runny Days, Sunny Days).
Jim Mitchell, 56, Irish politician.
Vjenceslav Richter, 85, Croatian architect.
Derek Robinson, 61, British nuclear physicist.
Edgar Scherick, 78, American television executive and producer.
Ben Wade, 80, American baseball player (Chicago Cubs, Brooklyn Dodgers, St. Louis Cardinals, Pittsburgh Pirates) and scout.
Mal Waldron, 77, American jazz pianist and composer (Billie Holiday, Charles Mingus, John Coltrane).
Fay Gillis Wells, 94, American pioneer aviator.
David Whiffen, 80, English physical chemist, known for his work on infrared spectroscopy and electron spin resonance spectroscopy.
Fred Zain, 51, American forensic laboratory technician, falsified results to obtain convictions, liver cancer.

3
Hariharananda Giri, 95, Indian yogi and guru.
Pierre Guillaume, 77, officer of the French Navy.
Carol Kramer, 59, American archaeologist.
Christian Liger, 67, French writer.
Emanuel Papper, 87, American anesthesiologist, professor, and author.
Glenn Quinn, 32, Irish actor (Roseanne, Angel), heroin overdose.
Jug Thesenga, 88, American baseball player (Washington Senators).

4
Charles Pierce Davey, 77, American welterweight boxer, complications from paralysis.
Freda Diesing, 77, Canadian carving artist.
Habibullah, Afghan US detainee, homicide.
Robert Mallet, 87, French writer and academic.
Dolores Renze, 95, American archivist and administrator.
Hemmo Silvennoinen, 70, Finnish ski jumper.

5
Roone Arledge, 71, American television producer and executive (Monday Night Football, Nightline).
Prosper Boulanger, 84, Canadian politician and a member of Parliament (House of Commons representing Mercier, Quebec).
Brigitte Massin, 75, French musicologist and journalist.
Ne Win, 91, Burmese dictator.
Jackie Walker, 52, American football player, complications from AIDS.
Ann Welch, 85, British glider pilot (gliding, hang gliding, paragliding, microlight flying).

6
Jerzy Adamski, 65, Polish featherweight boxer (silver medal winner in featherweight boxing at the 1960 Summer Olympics).
Clarence Beers, 83, American baseball player (St. Louis Cardinals).
Father Philip Berrigan, 79, American priest and political activist.
Russell Blattner, 94, American pediatrician and founding physician-in-chief of Texas Children's Hospital.
William H. Gleysteen, 76, American diplomat and ambassador.
Leroy M. Zimmerman, 69, American politician.

7
R. Orin Cornett, 89, American physicist, university professor and inventor of Cued Speech.
John R. Dellenback, 84, American politician (U.S. Representative for Oregon's 4th congressional district), viral pneumonia.
Clare Deniz, 91, British jazz pianist.
Barbara Howard, 76, Canadian painter, wood engraver, bookbinder and designer, pulmonary embolism.
Paddy Tunney, 81, Irish traditional artist.

8
Gunnar Helén, 84, Swedish politician.
Bobby Joe Hill, 59, American basketball player.
Arthur Iberall, 84, American physicist and hydrodynamicist, congestive heart failure.
Anil Moonesinghe, 75, Sri Lankan revolutionary politician and trade unionist.
Charles Rosen, 85, American computer scientist.
Dorothy Walker, 73, Irish art critic and historian, active in the development of the Irish Museum of Modern Art.
H. Nagappa, Indian politician, killed by Indian forest brigand Veerappan

9
Shigeru Chiba, 83, Japanese baseball player and manager, perhaps the greatest second baseman in Japanese baseball history.
Denawaka Hamine, 96, Sri Lankan actress.
Mary Hansen, 36, Australian guitarist and singer, traffic accident.
Ian Hornak, 58, American draughtsman, painter and printmaker, aortic aneurysm.
Johnny Lazor, 90, American baseball player (Boston Red Sox).
Stan Rice, 60, painter, educator, poet, husband of author Anne Rice, cancer.
Theodore Shackley, 75, American CIA officer known as "the Blond Ghost", cancer.
Ezra Solomon, 82, American economist and professor of economics.
To Huu, 82, Vietnamese poet and politician.

10
Desmond Keith Carter, 35, convicted murderer, executed by lethal injection in North Carolina.
Warwick Charlton, 84, English journalist, prime mover behind construction and sailing of Mayflower II from the U.K. to the U.S.
Les Costello, 74, Canadian professional ice hockey player and Catholic priest (Toronto Maple Leafs).
Earl Henry, 85, American baseball player (Cleveland Indians).
Mike Kosman, 85, American baseball player (Cincinnati Reds).
Andres Küng, 57, Swedish journalist, writer, entrepreneur and politician of Estonian origin.
Steve Llewellyn, 78, Welsh rugby league player.
Ian MacNaughton, 76, Scottish director of most episodes of Monty Python's Flying Circus.
Homer Spragins, 82, American baseball player (Philadelphia Phillies).

11
Dolly Dawn, 86, American big band vocalist and recording star of the 1930s and 1940s.
Muzaffer Demirhan, 70, Turkish alpine skier (Winter Olympics: 1948, 1956, 1960, 1964).
Bob Loane, 88, American baseball player (Washington Senators, Boston Bees).
Arthur Metcalfe, 64, British racing cyclist, cancer.
Nanabhoy Palkhivala, 82, Indian jurist and economist.
Marvin Breckinridge Patterson, 97, American photojournalist, cinematographer, and philanthropist.
Kay Rose, 80, American Oscar-winning sound editor.

12
Nikolai Amosov, 89, Soviet/Ukrainian heart surgeon and inventor.
Dee Brown, 94, American author and historian (Bury My Heart at Wounded Knee).
Nancy Caroline, 58, American EMS physician and writer (Emergency Care in the Streets).
Brad Dexter, 85, American actor and film producer (Run Silent Run Deep, The Magnificent Seven, None but the Brave).
Edward Harrison, 92, English cricketer and squash player.
Jay Wesley Neill, 37, convicted murderer, executed by lethal injection in Oklahoma.
Jabir Novruz, 69, Azerbaijani artist and poet.

13
Maria Björnson, 53, French theatre designer, two-time Tony Award winner for The Phantom of the Opera (Best Scenic Design, Best Costume Design).
Stella Brooks, 92, American jazz singer of the 1940s.
Ronald Butt, 82, British journalist, wrote a political column for The Times and was the author of two books on Parliament.
Zal Yanovsky, 57, Canadian folk rock musician, lead guitarist and singer for The Lovin' Spoonful.
Lucien Zins, 80, French Olympic swimmer (men's 100 metre backstroke: 1948, 1952).
Anthony Ler, 35, Singaporean graphic designer and convicted murderer executed by hanging at dawn in Singapore's Changi Prison for manipulating and hiring a minor who, on Ler's orders, murdered his wife Annie Leong.

14
Hank Arft, 80, American baseball player (St. Louis Browns).
Jack Bradley, 86, English football player.
Sidney Glazier, 86, American film producer.
Salman Raduyev, 35, Chechen separatist field commander, 'internal bleeding'.
Ray Wietecha, 74, American professional football player (Michigan State, New York Giants) and coach.
Antoni Woryna, 61, Polish speedway rider.

15
John Crosby, 76, American conductor, founded the Santa Fe Opera.
Charles E. Fraser, 73, American real estate developer, transformed Hilton Head Island into a world-class resort.
Vladimir Haensel, 88, American chemical engineer.
Arthur Jeph Parker, 79, American set decorator (The Shootist, The China Syndrome, Silverado).
Dick Stuart, 70, American baseball player (Pittsburgh Pirates, Boston Red Sox, Philadelphia Phillies).

16
Bill Hunter, 82, Canadian ice hockey player, general manager and coach, cancer.
Rolston James, 26, Trinidadian international football player, homicide.
Licínio Rangel, 66, Brazilian Roman Catholic bishop.
Don Vesco, 63, American businessperson and motorcycle racer, prostate cancer.

17
Colin Clark, 70, British film director and writer (My Week with Marilyn).
John Aubrey Davis, Sr., 90, American civil rights activist.
Joe Delaney, 85, American football player.
Mahmoud Fayad, 77, Egyptian weightlifter (gold medal in featherweight weightlifting at the 1948 Summer Olympics).
Aideu Handique, 87, Indian actress.
Frederick Knott, 86, English playwright and screenwriter (Dial M for Murder).
Hank Luisetti, 86, American basketball star and innovator.
Dame Mona Mitchell, 64, British courtier.

18
Saul Amarel, 74, American computer scientist, known for his pioneering work in artificial intelligence.
Earl Audet, 81, American professional football player (USC, Washington Redskins, Los Angeles Dons) and actor.
Lucy Grealy, 39, Irish-born American poet and memoirist.
Ramon John Hnatyshyn, 68, former Governor-General of Canada, pancreatitis.
Sir Bert Millichip, 88, British football administrator.
Wayne Owens, 65, U.S. Congressman (D-UT), heart attack.

19
Guy Bordelon, 80, American Korean War flying ace.
Claude Crocker, 78, American baseball player (Brooklyn Dodgers).
Stephen Fleck, 90, American psychiatrist.
Jim Flower, 79, British admiral.
Robert Evan Kendell, 67, Welsh psychiatrist.
Bob Rinker, 81, American baseball player (Philadelphia Athletics).
Arthur Rowley, 76, English footballer, holder of the record for most career league goals scored.
Lewis B. Smedes, 81, American theologian.
Roger Webb, 68, British musical director and composer (The Godsend, The Boy in Blue, Death of a Centerfold).
George Weller, 95, American World War II journalist, his Nagasaki nuclear bomb blast stories censored by U.S. military.

20
Leonard Bishop, 80, American novelist, and newspaper columnist.
Joanne Campbell, 38, British actress, starred in the 1980s comedy series Me and My Girl, deep-vein thrombosis.
Robert "Sonny" Carson, 66, U.S. Army Korean War veteran and civil rights activist.
James Richard Ham, 91, American Roman Catholic prelate.
John W. Hicks, 81, American agricultural economist and academic administrator.
Wheeler J. North, 80, American marine biologist and environmental scientist.
Grote Reber, 90, American pioneer of radio astronomy.

21
Jeu van Bun, 84, Dutch football player (football at the 1948 Summer Olympics).
Duke Callaghan, 88, American cinematographer (Conan the Barbarian, Jeremiah Johnson, Miami Vice).
Jules Fejer, 88, Hungarian physicist, made fundamental contributions in research on the Earth's ionosphere.
José Hierro, 80, Spanish poet.
Glen Seator, 46, American visual artist and conceptual sculptor, accidental fall.
Victor Watts, 64, British toponymist, medievalist, translator, and academic, heart attack.

22
William G. Bennett, 78, American gaming executive and real estate developer (Circus Circus Enterprises).
Ian Craib, 57, English sociologist and psychotherapist (The Importance of Disappointment).
Susan Fleming, 94, American actress (Million Dollar Legs, The Ziegfeld Follies) and wife of actor Harpo Marx.
Julius S. Held, 77, German art historian.
Desmond Hoyte, 73, President of Guyana from 1985 to 1992.
Joe Morgan, 57, New Zealand rugby union player.
Joe Strummer, 50, former singer for The Clash.
Kenneth Tobey, 85, American actor (Twelve O'Clock High, Gunfight at the O.K. Corral, The Thing from Another World).
Gabrielle Wittkop, 82, French writer (The Necrophiliac).

23
Tatamkhulu Afrika, 82, South African poet and writer.
Anthony Besch, 78, British opera and theatre director (English National Opera, Scottish Opera, New Opera Company).
George Bullard, 74, American baseball player (Detroit Tigers).
John Henry Kyl, 83, American politician.
Jimmy Osborne, 94, Australian soccer player.
Ratheesh, 48, Indian film actor, heart attack.

24
Alan Clodd, 84, Irish publisher, book collector, dealer and bibliographical researcher.
Ward Cuff, 89, American professional football player (New York Giants, Chicago Cardinals, Green Bay Packers).
Mohammed al Fassi, 50, Saudi Arabian sheik, known for provoking his Beverly Hills neighbors by applying garish paint colors.
James Ferman, 72, American-British film censor, secretary/director of British Board of Film Classification.
Erroll Fraser, 52, British Virgin Island speed skater (men's 500 metres, men's 1000 metres at the 1984 Winter Olympics).
Tita Merello, 98, Argentinian actress and singer.
V.K. Ramasamy, 76, Indian actor.
Jake Thackray, 64, English singer-songwriter, heart failure.
Arch Wilder, 85, Canadian professional hockey player (Detroit Red Wings).

25
Gabriel Almond, 91, American political scientist.
Isabel Mesa Delgado, 89, Spanish trade unionist, feminist, and anarchist.
William T. Orr, 85, American television executive producer (Maverick, F-Troop, 77 Sunset Strip).
Larry Uteck, 50, Canadian football player and coach, A.L.S.
Davina Whitehouse, 90, British-born New Zealand actress (Night Nurse, Sleeping Dogs, Braindead).

26
Paul P. Douglas Jr., 83, American U.S. Air Force flying ace, one of the most highly decorated combat aces of World War II.
Frank Reiber, 93, American baseball player (Detroit Tigers).
Herb Ritts, 50, celebrity photographer.
Armand Zildjian, 81, Armenian-American manufacturer of cymbals, chairman of the Avedis Zildjian Company.

27
Truid Blaisse-Terwindt, 85, Dutch hockey- and tennis player.
Bill Chipley, 82, American professional football player (Boston Yanks, New York Bulldogs).
Carla Henius, 83, German soprano and mezzo-soprano and librettist.
George Roy Hill, 81, American film director (Butch Cassidy and the Sundance Kid, The Sting, Slap Shot), Oscar winner (1974).
Mallory Evan Wijesinghe, 84, Sri Lankan engineer and entrepreneur.
Matsui Yayori, 68, Japanese journalist and women's rights activist.

28
Baba Raúl Cañizares, 47, American Santerían priest and writer.
Maria Carbone, 94, Italian operatic soprano.
Vladimir Chuyan, 62, Soviet sports shooter (men's 50 metre rifle three positions, men's 50 metre rifle prone at the 1964 Summer Olympics).
Koreyoshi Kurahara, 75, Japanese screenwriter and director.
Albert Stubbins, 83, English footballer.
Joseph Vadakkan, 83, Indian political activist priest and freedom fighter.
Meri Wilson, 53, American model and singer-songwriter ("Telephone Man"), car accident.

29
Al Babartsky, 87, American professional football player (Fordham University, Chicago Cardinals, Chicago Bears).
Billy Brown, 84, American triple jumper and long jumper (1941 world long jump leader, 1936 Summer Olympics men's triple jump).
Don Clarke, 69, New Zealand rugby player.
John Dreyfus, 84, British typographer and printing historian, his writings investigated and celebrated the evolution of type.
Sir Paul Hawkins, 90, British politician.
Victoria Lederberg, 65, Justice of the Rhode Island Supreme Court (1993–2002).
Július Satinský, 61, Slovak actor and comedian.
Foster Watkins, 85, American professional football player (West Texas A&M, Philadelphia Eagles).

30
Mary Brian, 96, American actress, silent and sound film star (Peter Pan, The Virginian, Charlie Chan in Paris, Man on the Flying Trapeze).
Barbara Durham, 60, American judge, first female chief justice of the Washington Supreme Court.
Eleanor J. Gibson, 92, American psychologist.
Antony Ponzini, 69, American actor.
Wang Fanxi, 95, Chinese Trotskyist revolutionary.
Mary Wesley, 90, English novelist (Jumping the Queue, The Camomile Lawn, Part of the Furniture).

31
D. J. Enright, 82, British poet, novelist and critic.
Billy Morris, 84, Welsh footballer.
Kevin MacMichael, 51, Canadian guitarist and singer-songwriter (Cutting Crew), lung cancer.
Li Rong, 82, Chinese linguist.
Desmond Tester, 83, English film and television actor and television presenter.

References 

2002-12
 12